The 2021 Campeonato Paulista de Futebol Profissional da Primeira Divisão - Série A1 was the 120th season of São Paulo's top professional football league. The competition was played from 28 February to 23 May 2021.

In addition, it was also decided that Paulistão 2021 will have VAR in all games, including those in the first phase of the competition.

Format
In the first stage the sixteen teams are drawn, with seeding, into four groups of four teams each, with each team playing once against the twelve clubs from the other three groups. After each team has played twelve matches, the top two teams of each group qualify for the quarter-final stage.
After the completion of the first stage, the two clubs with the lowest number of points, regardless of the group, will be relegated to the Campeonato Paulista Série A2.
Quarter-finals, semi-finals and finals are played in a two-legged home and away fixture, with the best placed first stage team playing the second leg at home.
In case of a draw in any knockout stage, the match will be decided by a penalty shoot-out.
The two highest-placed teams not otherwise qualified will qualify for the 2022 Copa do Brasil.
The top three highest-placed teams in the general table at the end of the competition who are not playing in any level of the national Brazilian football league system will qualify for the 2022 Campeonato Brasileiro Série D.

Tiebreakers
The teams are ranked according to points (3 points for a win, 1 point for a draw, 0 points for a loss). If two or more teams are equal on points on completion of the group matches, the following criteria are applied to determine the rankings:
Higher number of wins;
Superior goal difference;
Higher number of goals scored;
Fewest red cards received;
Fewest yellow cards received;
Draw in the headquarters of the FPF.

Teams

First stage

Group A

Group B

Group C

Group D

Troféu do Interior

The Troféu do Interior of the 2021 Campeonato Paulista began on 12 May with the quarter-finals and ended on 20 May 2021 with the final. A total of six teams compete in the Troféu Interior.

Round dates

Bracket

Quarter-finals

Note: The match was concluded the following day, due to a power outage at the stadium.

Semi-finals

Final

Knockout stage

The knockout stage of the 2021 Campeonato Paulista began on 11 May with the quarter-finals and end on 23 May 2021 with the final. A total of eight teams compete in the knockout stage.

Round dates

Format
The quarter-finals will be played in a single match at the stadium of the better-ranked team in the first phase. If no goals were scored during the match, the tie will be decided via a penalty shoot-out. The semi-finals will be played with the same format as the quarter-finals.
The finals will be played over two legs, with the team having the better record in matches from the previous stages hosting the second leg.

Qualified teams

Bracket

Quarter-finals

Semi-finals

Finals

First leg

Second leg

Overall table

Awards

Top scorers

References

Campeonato Paulista seasons
Paulista